UPI is United Press International, a global news agency headquartered in Miami, Florida.

UPI may also refer to:

Organizations
 Universal Pictures International, an American film studio
 Union of Italian Provinces (Unione delle Province d'Italia)
 Ural Polytechnic Institute, now Ural State Technical University, Russia
 Indonesia University of Education (Universitas Pendidikan Indonesia)

Computing
 Intel Ultra Path Interconnect, a processor interconnect
 User Programmatic Interface (Oracle Database API)

Financial services
 UnionPay, a Chinese payment cards company
 Unified Payments Interface, of National Payments Corporation of India

Places
 Upi, Maguindanao, Philippines (also known as North Upi)
 South Upi Maguindanao, Philippines
 Upi, an ancient indigenous settlement in Northwest Field (Guam)
 Upi or Upu, historic region surrounding Damascus

Other uses
 Upi Darmayana Tamin (born 1970), Indonesian chess player
 Urpo Pikkupeura (born 1957), former Finnish skater
 Ulcer Performance Index, stock market risk measure